Bellaspira hannyae is a species of sea snail, a marine gastropod mollusk in the family Drilliidae.

Description
The height of the shell varies between 5 mm and 8 mm.

Distribution
This species occurs in Caribbean Sea off the Netherlands Antilles and Venezuela.

References

 Jong, K. M. de and H. E. Coomans. 1988. Marine gastropods from Curaçao, Aruba and Bonaire Studies on the Fauna of Curaçao and other Caribbean Islands 69 1–261, 47 pls.

External links
 
  Fallon P.J. (2016). Taxonomic review of tropical western Atlantic shallow water Drilliidae (Mollusca: Gastropoda: Conoidea) including descriptions of 100 new species. Zootaxa. 4090(1): 1-363

hannyae
Gastropods described in 1988